William H. Pritchard (born 1932) is an American literary critic and the Henry Clay Folger Professor of English, Emeritus, at Amherst College.

Early life and education 
William Harrison Pritchard, Jr., was born in 1932, the son of William H. Pritchard and Marion (LaGrange) Pritchard of Johnson City, New York. A graduate of Johnson City High School at age 16, he earned an A.B. in philosophy at  Amherst College in 1953, and an M.A. (1956) and a Ph.D. in English (1960) at Harvard University, with the dissertation, The uses of nature; a study of Robert Frost's poetry. 

Pritchard and Marietta Perl wed in August, 1957, in the Harvard University Chapel.

Career 
Pritchard began teaching at Amherst in 1958. His academic interests include American and British 20th century fiction, poetry and literary criticism.

Selected publications

Books

Articles

Awards, honors 
 National Endowment for the Humanities Fellowship (1977-78, 1986)
 Guggenheim Foundation Fellowship (1973-1974)
 American Council of Learned Societies Junior Fellowship (1963-64); Fellowship (1977-78)
 Henry Clay Folger Professor of English (1984)

Scholarly and Professional Activities 
 American Academy of Arts & Sciences (elected 2004)
 Association of Literary Scholars and Critics

References

External links 

 David Sofield and William H. Pritchard (mp3 audio, 32:08)
 Friends of the Library Oral Histories: William Pritchard Interviewed by Rand R. Cooper (August 15, 2002)(video, 1:55:31)
 Bill Pritchard, Amherst at 200: Celebrating Mind, Heart, and Community
 A tribute to John Updike (video, 1:02:06; Pritchard's speech from 47:47–55:02)
 Remembering John Updike

1932 births
Literary critics of English
American academicians
Amherst College alumni
Harvard University alumni
Amherst College faculty
American Academy of Arts and Sciences